Swaranjit Singh (born 18 July 1932) is a former Indian first-class cricketer. 

Singh was a left-handed batsman and right-arm medium-pace bowler who played for Eastern Punjab and Bengal in India as well as Cambridge University and Warwickshire in England between 1950 and 1962.

Swaranjit Singh was educated at Khalsa College, Amritsar and Punjab University before going to England to study at Christ's College, Cambridge. While he was a student at Christ's College in the 1950s, he married a fellow student from Germany. Manmohan Singh, who later became Prime Minister of India, attended their wedding. Swaranjit and his wife Irmengard, who converted to Sikhism, settled in Amritsar.

References

External links

1932 births
Living people
Indian cricketers
Warwickshire cricketers
Gentlemen cricketers
Eastern Punjab cricketers
Cambridge University cricketers
Marylebone Cricket Club cricketers
North Zone cricketers
Bengal cricketers
Cricketers from Amritsar
Alumni of Christ's College, Cambridge